The  are botanical gardens operated by Hokkaido University. They are located at North 3, West 8, Chūō-ku, Sapporo, Hokkaidō, Japan, and open daily; an admission fee is charged.

The gardens were established in 1886 as part of the Old Sapporo Agricultural College, and are now the second oldest botanical gardens in Japan (after Koishikawa Botanical Garden). Today they form part of the university's School of Agriculture, and contain a small part of the forest formerly covering the Ishikari Plain, plus collections of over 4,000 plant species, including alpine plants, wild plants from Hokkaidō, and the oldest lilac in Sapporo. Serious typhoon damage was sustained in 2004.

The gardens also contain early Hokkaidō homes, a tropical greenhouse, and the Natural History Museum (built 1884), which exhibits Ainu artefacts, local archaeological and biological specimens, and the stuffed body of Taro, one of two surviving sled dogs from Japan's 1958 Antarctica mission.

See also 
 List of botanical gardens in Japan

References

External links 

 Hokkaido University Botanical Gardens (Japanese)
 Hokkaido description
 Japan Guide article
 Inagawa Hironori et al., "How we coped with the Serious Damage by Typhoon No. 18 in 2004 at the Botanic Garden,

Botanical gardens in Japan
Hokkaido University
Chūō-ku, Sapporo
Gardens in Hokkaido
Museums in Sapporo
Tourist attractions in Sapporo